Mohamed-Labib Maouche (born 10 January 1993) is a French footballer who plays as a midfielder.

Career
Maouche signed for Oldham Athletic in September 2017. He signed a new contract in July 2019.
He was released by Oldham Athletic at the end of the 2019–20 season.

On 8 January 2021, Maouche signed for Scottish side Ross County on a short term deal until the end of the season. He was released from County at the end of the season without making a single appearance for the club.

Personal life
Maouche was born in France and is of Algerian descent. His brother Yassin Maouche is also a professional footballer.

Career statistics

Club

References

1993 births
AS Saint-Étienne players
Association football midfielders
FC Lausanne-Sport players
French footballers
French sportspeople of Algerian descent
Ligue 2 players
Living people
Oldham Athletic A.F.C. players
Ross County F.C. players
Servette FC players
Sportspeople from Annecy
Tours FC players
Footballers from Auvergne-Rhône-Alpes
French expatriate footballers
Expatriate footballers in England
Expatriate footballers in Scotland
French expatriate sportspeople in Scotland
French expatriate sportspeople in England